Castelnovo Bariano is a comune (municipality) in the Province of Rovigo in the Italian region Veneto, located about  southwest of Venice and about  west of Rovigo.

Castelnovo Bariano borders the following municipalities: Bergantino, Carbonara di Po, Castelmassa, Ceneselli, Giacciano con Baruchella, Legnago, Sermide e Felonica and Villa Bartolomea.

References

Cities and towns in Veneto